Mordellistena palliata is a species of beetle in the genus Mordellistena of the family Mordellidae. It was described by Kôno in 1932.

References

Beetles described in 1932
palliata
Taxa named by Hiromichi Kono